This is a list of moths of the family Noctuidae that are found in South Africa. It also acts as an index to the species articles and forms part of the full List of moths of South Africa.

Ableptina nubifera (Hampson, 1902)
Abrostola brevipennis (Walker, 1858)
Abrostola oculea Dufay, 1958
Abrostola triopis Hampson, 1902h
Acanthodelta distriga Hampson, 1908
Acantholipes namacensis (Guenée, 1852)
Acantholipes trajecta (Walker, 1865)
Acantholipes trimeni Felder & Rogenhofer, 1874
Achaea boris (Geyer, 1837)
Achaea catella Guenée, 1852
Achaea chrysopera Druce, 1912
Achaea echo (Walker, 1858)
Achaea ezea (Cramer, 1779)
Achaea faber Holland, 1894
Achaea finita (Guenée, 1852)
Achaea illustrata Walker, 1858
Achaea indeterminata (Walker, 1865)
Achaea infinita (Guenée, 1852)
Achaea intermedia Wallengren, 1856
Achaea lienardi (Boisduval, 1833)
Achaea mercatoria (Fabricius, 1775)
Achaea mormoides Walker, 1858
Achaea obvia Hampson, 1913
Achaea praestans (Guenée, 1852)
Achaea rufobrunnea Strand, 1913
Achaea sordida (Walker, 1865)
Achaea tornistigma Prout, 1921
Achaea trapezoides (Guenée, 1862)
Acontia accola (Felder & Rogenhofer, 1874)
Acontia antica Walker, 1862
Acontia bechuana Hacker, Legrain & Fibiger, 2010
Acontia bidentata (Hampson, 1902)
Acontia caffraria (Cramer, 1777)
Acontia capensis Hacker, Legrain & Fibiger, 2008
Acontia chrysoproctis (Hampson, 1902)
Acontia citripennis (Hampson, 1910)
Acontia conifrons (Aurivillius, 1879)
Acontia discoidea Hopffer, 1857
Acontia dispar (Walker, [1858])
Acontia dorothea Hacker, Legrain & Fibiger, 2008
Acontia ectorrida (Hampson, 1916)
Acontia flavitermina (Hampson, 1902)
Acontia gradata Walker, 1858
Acontia gratiosa Wallengren, 1856
Acontia guttifera Felder & Rogenhofer, 1874
Acontia hampsoni Hacker, Legrain & Fibiger, 2008
Acontia imitatrix Wallengren, 1856
Acontia insocia (Walker, 1857)
Acontia katrina Hacker, Legrain & Fibiger, 2008
Acontia kruegeri Hacker, Legrain & Fibiger, 2008
Acontia leucotrigona (Hampson, 1905)
Acontia margaritata (Drury, 1782)
Acontia mellicula Hacker, Legrain & Fibiger, 2008
Acontia mionides (Hampson, 1905)
Acontia natalis (Guenée, 1852)
Acontia nephele Hampson, 1911
Acontia nubilata (Hampson, 1902)
Acontia oranjensis Hacker, Legrain & Fibiger, 2008
Acontia paratrigona Hacker, Legrain & Fibiger, 2008
Acontia permutata Hacker, Legrain & Fibiger, 2008
Acontia porphyrea (Butler, 1898)
Acontia psaliphora (Hampson, 1910)
Acontia santalucia Hacker, Legrain & Fibiger, 2008
Acontia silus Wallengren, 1875
Acontia simo Wallengren, 1860
Acontia sphendonistis (Hampson, 1902)
Acontia tanzaniae Hacker, Legrain & Fibiger, 2010
Acontia tetragonisa (Hampson, 1910)
Acontia tinctilis Wallengren, 1875
Acontia torrefacta (Distant, 1898)
Acontia transfigurata Wallengren, 1856
Acontia trimaculata Aurivillius, 1879
Acontia trychaenoides Wallengren, 1856
Acontia umbrigera Felder & Rogenhofer, 1874
Acontia wahlbergi Wallengren, 1856
Acrapex aenigma (Felder & Rogenhofer, 1874)
Acrapex albivena Hampson, 1910
Acrapex breviptera Janse, 1939
Acrapex brunnea Hampson, 1910
Acrapex curvata Hampson, 1902
Acrapex festiva Janse, 1939
Acrapex fuscifasciata Janse, 1939
Acrapex hemiphlebia (Hampson, 1914)
Acrapex metaphaea Hampson, 1910
Acrapex minima Janse, 1939
Acrapex mystica Janse, 1939
Acrapex simplex Janse, 1939
Acrapex stygiata (Hampson, 1910)
Acrapex tristrigata Warren, 1914
Acronicta niveogrisea Krüger, 2001
Acronicta silvicola Krüger, 2001
Acronicta transvalica Hampson, 1911
Acronicta vumbae Krüger, 2001
Adisura aerugo (Felder & Rogenhofer, 1874)
Adisura atkinsoni Moore, 1881
Aedia leucomelas (Linnaeus, 1758)
Aegocera fervida (Walker, 1854)
Afrogortyna altimontana Krüger, 1997
Afrogortyna trinota (Herrich-Schäffer, 1854)
Agoma trimenii (Felder, 1874)
Agrapha amydra (Dufay, 1972)
Agrapha caelata (Dufay, 1972)
Agrapha phoceoides (Dufay, 1972)
Agrapha polycampta (Dufay, 1972)
Agrapha scoteina (Dufay, 1972)
Agrotis biconica Kollar, 1844
Agrotis bilix Guenée, 1852
Agrotis bitriangula Hampson, 1902
Agrotis caffra (Hampson, 1903)
Agrotis cinctithorax (Walker, 1857)
Agrotis contingens (Warren, 1914)
Agrotis crassilinea Wallengren, 1860
Agrotis ipsilon (Hufnagel, 1766)
Agrotis lanidorsa Guenée, 1852
Agrotis longidentifera (Hampson, 1903)
Agrotis oliveata Hampson, 1902
Agrotis perirrorata Hampson, 1902
Agrotis segetum ([Denis & Schiffermüller], 1775)
Agrotis subalba Walker, 1857
Alelimma pallicostalis Hampson, 1902
Aletia consanguis (Guenée, 1852)
Aletia inframicans (Hampson, 1893)
Aletia panarista (D. S. Fletcher, 1963)
Aletia pyrausta (Hampson, 1913)
Aletia tincta (Walker, 1858)
Amazonides atrisigna (Hampson, 1911)
Amazonides dividens (Walker, 1857)
Amazonides putrefacta (Guenée, 1852)
Amazonides rufomixta (Hampson, 1903)
Amblyprora magnifica (Schaus, 1893)
Amefrontia purpurea Hampson, 1899
Amphia subunita Guenée, 1852
Amphidrina melanosema Hampson, 1914
Amphidrina pexicera Hampson, 1909
Amphidrina sinistra Janse, 1938
Amyna axis Guenée, 1852
Amyna natalica Pinhey, 1975
Amyna punctum (Fabricius, 1794)
Anathetis atrirena (Hampson, 1902)
Anathetis melanofascia Janse, 1938
Androlymnia torsivena (Hampson, 1902)
Anedhella interrupta (Janse, 1938)
Anedhella nigrivittata (Hampson, 1902)
Anedhella stigmata (Janse, 1938)
Anoba angulilinea (Holland, 1894)
Anoba atriplaga (Walker, 1858)
Anoba atripuncta (Hampson, 1902)
Anoba disjuncta (Walker, 1865)
Anoba hamifera (Hampson, 1902)
Anoba microloba Hampson, 1926
Anoba phaeotermesia Hampson, 1926
Anoba plumipes (Wallengren, 1860)
Anoba sinuata (Fabricius, 1775)
Anomis auragoides (Guenée, 1852)
Anomis bidentata (Hampson, 1910)
Anomis capensis (Gaede, 1940)
Anomis erosa (Hübner, 1818)
Anomis flava (Fabricius, 1775)
Anomis fulvida Guenée, 1852
Anomis leona (Schaus & Clements, 1893)
Anomis luperca Möschler, 1883
Anomis sabulifera (Guenée, 1852)
Anomis simulatrix (Walker, 1856)
Anomis subrosealis (Walker, 1866)
Antarchaea fragilis (Butler, 1875)
Anticarsia rubricans (Boisduval, 1833)
Antiophlebia bracteata Felder, 1874
Apospasta dipterigidia (Hampson, 1902)
Araea indecora (Felder & Rogenhofer, 1874)
Araeopteron griseata Hampson, 1907
Archephia basilinea (Hampson, 1902)
Arenarba destituta (Moore, 1884)
Argyrogramma signata (Fabricius, 1775)
Ariathisa abyssinia (Guenée, 1852)
Ariathisa semiluna (Hampson, 1909)
Ascalapha odorata (Linnaeus, 1758)
Asota borbonica (Boisduval, 1833)
Asota speciosa (Drury, 1773)
Aspidifrontia radiata Hampson, 1905
Asplenia melanodonta (Hampson, 1896)
Athetis absorbens (Walker, 1857)
Athetis aeneolineata Krüger, 2001
Athetis aeschria Hampson, 1909
Athetis albipuncta (Hampson, 1902)
Athetis alpina Krüger, 2001
Athetis alternata (Janse, 1938)
Athetis assecta Krüger, 2001
Athetis atristicta Hampson, 1918
Athetis aurobrunnea (Janse, 1938)
Athetis aurogrisea Krüger, 2000
Athetis auronitens Krüger, 2000
Athetis bicornuta Krüger, 2000
Athetis collaris (Wallengren, 1856)
Athetis collicola Krüger, 2001
Athetis consocia Krüger, 2001
Athetis debilis Krüger, 2000
Athetis duplex (Janse, 1938)
Athetis euxoa Krüger, 2001
Athetis excurvata (Janse, 1938)
Athetis flavipuncta Hampson, 1909
Athetis foveata Hampson, 1909
Athetis fraus Krüger, 2000
Athetis fulgens Krüger, 2001
Athetis fumicolor (Janse, 1938)
Athetis glauca (Hampson, 1902)
Athetis gonionephra Hampson, 1909
Athetis gracilis Krüger, 2001
Athetis heliastis Hampson, 1909
Athetis ignava (Guenée, 1852)
Athetis instrata Krüger, 2001
Athetis interlata (Walker, 1857)
Athetis intricata Krüger, 2001
Athetis leucopis (Hampson, 1902)
Athetis melanephra Hampson, 1909
Athetis melanomma Hampson, 1920
Athetis melanopis Hampson, 1909
Athetis melanosticta Hampson, 1909
Athetis metis (Janse, 1938)
Athetis micra (Hampson, 1902)
Athetis mozambica Hampson, 1918
Athetis nephrosticta Hampson, 1909
Athetis nigra (Janse, 1938)
Athetis nigristriata Krüger, 2000
Athetis obscuroides Poole, 1989
Athetis ocellata (Janse, 1938)
Athetis pallescens (Janse, 1938)
Athetis pallicornis (Felder & Rogenhofer, 1874)
Athetis partita (Walker, 1857)
Athetis perplexa (Janse, 1938)
Athetis pigra (Guenée, 1852)
Athetis restricta (Janse, 1938)
Athetis rhigognostis Krüger, 2001
Athetis robertsi (Janse, 1938)
Athetis robusta Krüger, 2000
Athetis rufipuncta (Hampson, 1902)
Athetis satellitia (Hampson, 1902)
Athetis signata (Janse, 1938)
Athetis singula (Möschler, 1883)
Athetis smintha (Hampson, 1902)
Athetis sordida Krüger, 2001
Athetis splendidula Krüger, 2001
Athetis transvalensis (Janse, 1938)
Athetis tristigmatica Krüger, 2000
Athetis umbrigera Krüger, 2000
Athetis xantholopha (Hampson, 1902)
Athyrma anuliplaga Walker, 1865
Attatha attathoides (Karsch, 1896)
Attatha superba (Janse, 1917)
Audea albifasciata Pinhey, 1968
Audea bipunctata Walker, 1857
Audea fatilega (Felder & Rogenhofer, 1874)
Audea hypostigmata Hampson, 1913
Audea melaleuca Walker, 1865
Audea melanoplaga Hampson, 1902
Audea subligata Distant, 1902
Authadistis metaleuca Hampson, 1902
Autoba admota (Felder & Rogenhofer, 1874)
Autoba brachygonia (Hampson, 1910)
Autoba costimacula (Saalmüller, 1880)
Autoba olivacea (Walker, 1858)
Avitta lineosa (Saalmüller, 1891)
Axiopoeniella octocentra Vári, 1964
Axylia annularis Saalmüller, 1891
Axylia dispilata Swinhoe, 1891
Axylia renalis Moore, 1881
Bamra delicata Hampson, 1922
Bamra marmorifera (Walker, 1858)
Baniana arvorum (Guenée, 1852)
Baniana culminifera Hampson, 1910
Bareia incidens Walker, 1858
Bleptina frontalis Walker, 1862
Bleptina intractalis Walker, 1862
Bocula terminata (Walker, 1869)
Bonaberiana crassisquama Strand, 1915
Brachypteragrotis patricei Viette, 1959
Brephos ansorgei (Jordan, 1904)
Brephos decora (Linnaeus, 1764)
Brephos festiva (Jordan, 1913)
Brephos incongruella Warren, 1914
Brevipecten confluens Hampson, 1926
Brevipecten cornuta Hampson, 1902
Brevipecten legraini Hacker & Fibiger, 2007
Brevipecten wolframmeyi Hacker & Fibiger, 2007
Britha brithodes D. S. Fletcher, 1961
Brithys crini (Fabricius, 1775)
Brithysana speyeri (Felder & Rogenhofer, 1874)
Busseola fusca (Fuller, 1901)
Busseola obliquifascia (Hampson, 1909)
Busseola phaia Bowden, 1956
Calamia flavirufa Hampson, 1910
Calesia karschi (Bartel, 1903)
Calesia othello (Fawcett, 1916)
Calesia phaiosoma (Hampson, 1891)
Calesia xanthognatha Hampson, 1926
Calesia zambesita Walker, 1865
Caligatus angasii Wing, 1850
Calliodes appollina Guenée, 1852
Calliodes pretiosissima Holland, 1892
Callixena versicolora Saalmüller, 1891
Callopistria albivitta (Hampson, 1918)
Callopistria insularis Butler, 1882
Callopistria latreillei (Duponchel, 1827)
Callopistria maillardi (Guenée, 1862)
Callopistria natalensis (Hampson, 1908)
Callopistria yerburii Butler, 1884
Callyna decora Walker, 1858
Callyna figurans Walker, 1858
Callyna gaedei Hacker & Fibiger, 2006
Callyna monoleuca Walker, 1858
Callyna nigerrima Hampson, 1902
Callyna unicolor Hampson, 1920
Caradrina atriluna Guenée, 1852
Caradrina clavipalpis (Scopoli, 1763)
Caradrina eugraphis Janse, 1938
Caradrina ferida Pagenstecher, 1893
Caradrina glaucistis Hampson, 1902
Caradrina supercilia Wallengren, 1856
Caradrina tenebrata Hampson, 1902
Carpostalagma chalybeata Talbot, 1929
Catephia barrettae Hampson, 1905
Catephia discophora Hampson, 1926
Catephia pallididisca Hampson, 1926
Catephia personata Walker, 1865
Catephia squamosa (Wallengren, 1856)
Catephia striata Hampson, 1902
Catephia virescens Hampson, 1902
Centrarthra albiapicata Warren, 1914
Centrarthra albinotata Janse, 1938
Centrarthra albipuncta Janse, 1938
Centrarthra albistriga Janse, 1938
Centrarthra albogrisea Janse, 1938
Centrarthra argentea Warren, 1914
Centrarthra brevipectinata Janse, 1938
Centrarthra brunnea Warren, 1914
Centrarthra cretacea Warren, 1914
Centrarthra dentata Janse, 1938
Centrarthra dicksoni Janse, 1938
Centrarthra diffusa Janse, 1938
Centrarthra fulvinotata Warren, 1914
Centrarthra fulvitincta Warren, 1914
Centrarthra furcivitta Hampson, 1909
Centrarthra griseola Janse, 1938
Centrarthra hexistigma Janse, 1938
Centrarthra modesta Janse, 1938
Centrarthra monochroma Janse, 1938
Centrarthra nigrosignata Janse, 1938
Centrarthra ochrealis Janse, 1938
Centrarthra ossicolor Warren, 1914
Centrarthra pallescens Warren, 1914
Centrarthra pectinata Janse, 1938
Centrarthra pygmaea Janse, 1938
Centrarthra serricornis Janse, 1938
Centrarthra similus Janse, 1938
Centrarthra vansoni Janse, 1938
Centrogone chlorochrysa Hampson, 1910
Ceraptila reniferalis Guenée, 1854
Cerocala contraria (Walker, 1865)
Cerocala insana (Herrich-Schäffer, 1858)
Cerocala vermiculosa Herrich-Schäffer, [1858]
Cerynea endotrichalis Hampson, 1910
Cerynea ignealis Hampson, 1910
Cerynea thermesialis (Walker, 1866)
Cerynea virescens Hampson, 1910
Cetola costata Gaede, 1915
Cetola radiata Hampson, 1909
Chabuata rufilinea Hampson, 1910
Chalciope delta (Boisduval, 1833)
Chalciope erecta Hampson, 1902
Chalciope pusilla (Holland, 1894)
Chalestra podaresalis Walker, 1859
Chasmina candida (Walker, 1865)
Chasmina tibialis (Fabricius, 1775)
Chitasida diplogramma (Hampson, 1905)
Chlumetia albiapicata (Hampson, 1902)
Chlumetia lichenosa (Hampson, 1902)
Chlumetia polymorpha Hampson, 1920
Chrysodeixis acuta (Walker, [1858])
Chrysodeixis chalcites (Esper, 1789)
Chrysodeixis eriosoma (Doubleday, 1843)
Chrysozonata latiflavaria (Swinhoe, 1904)
Chrysozonata purpurascens Hampson, 1914
Chusaris venata Warren, 1914
Chytonix brunnea Gaede, 1915
Cnodifrontia dissimilis (Distant, 1898)
Colbusa euclidica Walker, 1865
Colpocheilopteryx operatrix (Wallengren, 1860)
Compsotata elegantissima (Guenée, 1852)
Condica capensis (Guenée, 1852)
Condica conducta (Walker, 1857)
Condica pauperata (Walker, 1858)
Conicofrontia diamesa (Hampson, 1920)
Conicofrontia sesamoides Hampson, 1902
Conservula anthophyes (D. S. Fletcher, 1963)
Conservula cinisigna de Joannis, 1906
Conservula clarki Janse, 1937
Conservula minor Holland, 1896
Copifrontia purpurea (Gaede, 1915)
Corgatha chionocraspis Hampson, 1918
Corgatha odontota D. S. Fletcher, 1961
Corgatha producta Hampson, 1902
Corgatha regula Gaede, 1916
Cortyta canescens Walker, 1858
Cortyta diapera Hampson, 1913
Cortyta phaeocyma Hampson, 1913
Cosmia natalensis (Prout, 1925)
Cosmia polymorpha Pinhey, 1968
Crameria amabilis (Drury, 1773)
Craniophora paragrapha (Felder, 1874)
Craterestra definiens (Walker, 1857)
Cretonia vegeta (Swinhoe, 1885)
Crionica cervicornis (Fawcett, 1917)
Crionica diversipennis Gaede, 1939
Cryphia deceptura (Walker, 1865)
Cryphia fulvifusa (Hampson, 1911)
Ctenoplusia accentifera (Lefèbvre, 1827)
Ctenoplusia dorfmeisteri (Felder & Rogenhofer, 1874)
Ctenoplusia fracta (Walker, 1857)
Ctenoplusia furcifera (Walker, 1857)
Ctenoplusia limbirena (Guenée, 1852)
Ctenoplusia phocea (Hampson, 1910)
Ctenusa curvilinea Hampson, 1913
Ctenusa varians (Wallengren, 1863)
Cucullia albifuscata Janse, 1939
Cucullia albilineata Gaede, 1934
Cucullia argentivitta (Hampson, 1906)
Cucullia atrimacula Hampson, 1909
Cucullia brunnea Hampson, 1902
Cucullia chrysota Hampson, 1902
Cucullia clausa Walker, 1857
Cucullia consimilis Felder & Rogenhofer, 1874
Cucullia daedalis Janse, 1939
Cucullia extricata (Walker, 1857)
Cucullia hutchinsoni Hampson, 1902
Cucullia inaequalis Janse, 1939
Cucullia leucopis Hampson, 1906
Cucullia minuta Möschler, 1883
Cucullia nigrilinea Janse, 1939
Cucullia nocturnalis Gaede, 1934
Cucullia pallidicolor Janse, 1939
Cucullia pallidistria Felder & Rogenhofer, 1874
Cucullia perstriata Hampson, 1906
Cucullia platti Prout, 1925
Cucullia pusilla Möschler, 1883
Cucullia pyrostrota (Hampson, 1906)
Cucullia ruptifascia (Hampson, 1909)
Cuneisigna cumamita (Bethune-Baker, 1911)
Cuneisigna obstans (Walker, 1858)
Cuneisigna rivulata (Hampson, 1902)
Cyclopera bucephalidia (Hampson, 1902)
Cyclopera galactiplaga (Hampson, 1902)

Cyligramma fluctuosa (Drury, 1773)
Cyligramma joa Boisduval, 1833
Cyligramma latona (Cramer, 1775)
Cyligramma limacina (Guérin-Méneville, 1832)
Cyligramma magus (Guérin-Méneville, [1844])
Cytothymia absita (Felder & Rogenhofer, 1874)
Dasypolia informis (Walker, 1857)
Deinopa flavida Hampson, 1926
Diaphone eumela (Stoll, 1781)
Diaphone lampra Karsch, 1894
Diargyria argyhorion Krüger, 2009
Diargyria argyrodeixis Krüger, 2009
Diarsia sicca (Guenée, 1852)
Dicerogastra furvilinea (Hampson, 1902)
Dichromia erastrialis (Walker, 1866)
Dichromia mesomelaena (Hampson, 1902)
Dichromia mutilata (Strand, 1909)
Dichromia semlikiensis (Prout, 1921)
Digama aganais (Felder, 1874)
Digama budonga Bethune-Baker, 1913
Digama lithosioides Swinhoe, 1907
Digama meridionalis Swinhoe, 1907
Digama ostentata Distant, 1899
Digama spilleri (Bethune-Baker, 1908)
Dimorphinoctua cunhaensis Viette, 1952
Dimorphinoctua goughensis D. S. Fletcher, 1963
Diphtherocome verbenata (Distant, 1898)
Disticta atava (Felder & Rogenhofer, 1874)
Dysgnathia nigropunctata (Bethune-Baker, 1906)
Dysgonia abnegans (Walker, 1858)
Dysgonia angularis (Boisduval, 1833)
Dysgonia chiliensis (Guenée, 1852)
Dysgonia conjunctura (Walker, 1858)
Dysgonia crameri Moore, 1885
Dysgonia derogans (Walker, 1858)
Dysgonia erectata (Hampson, 1902)
Dysgonia joviana (Stoll, 1782)
Dysgonia latifascia Warren, 1888
Dysgonia properans (Walker, 1858)
Dysgonia proxima (Hampson, 1902)
Dysgonia torrida (Guenée, 1852)
Dysgonia triplocyma (Hampson, 1913)
Dysmilichia purpurascens Hampson, 1910
Ecpatia dulcistriga (Walker, 1858)
Ectochela aberrans Gaede, 1915
Ectochela albilunata Gaede, 1915
Ectochela canina (Felder, 1874)
Ectochela flavilunata Gaede, 1915
Ectochela nigrilineata Gaede, 1915
Ectochela turneri Tams, 1930
Ectolopha viridescens Hampson, 1902
Effractilis effracta (Distant, 1898)
Egnasia lioperas Prout, 1922
Egnasia vicaria (Walker, 1866)
Egybolis vaillantina (Stoll, 1790)
Eldana saccharina
Elyptron ethiopica (Hampson, 1909)
Enispa albigrisea (Warren, 1914)
Entomogramma grisea Wallengren, 1856
Entomogramma pardus Guenée, 1852
Epimeciodes abunda (Felder & Rogenhofer, 1874)
Episparis leucotessellis Hampson, 1902
Episparis xanthographa Hampson, 1926
[[Erastria [in Geometridae] varipalpis]] Walker, 1865
Ercheia subsignata (Walker, 1865)

Erebus atavistis (Hampson, 1913)
Erebus macrops (Linnaeus, 1767)
Erebus walkeri (Butler, 1875)
Ericeia albangula (Saalmüller, 1880)
Ericeia congregata (Walker, 1858)
Ericeia congressa (Walker, 1858)
Ericeia inangulata (Guenée, 1852)
Ericeia sobria Walker, 1858
Ethiopica polyastra Hampson, 1909
Ethiopica vinosa (Hampson, 1902)
Ethioterpia lichenea Janse, 1938
Ethioterpia marmorata Janse, 1938
Eublemma albivena (Hampson, 1910)
Eublemma albivia Hampson, 1914
Eublemma anachoresis (Wallengren, 1863)
Eublemma apicata Distant, 1898
Eublemma baccalix (Swinhoe, 1886)
Eublemma bifasciata (Moore, 1881)
Eublemma bipartita Hampson, 1902
Eublemma bolinia (Hampson, 1902)
Eublemma chionophlebia Hampson, 1910
Eublemma cochylioides (Guenée, 1852)
Eublemma daphoena Hampson, 1910
Eublemma decora (Walker, 1869)
Eublemma delicata (Felder & Rogenhofer, 1874)
Eublemma ecthaemata Hampson, 1896
Eublemma eupethecica Hampson, 1910
Eublemma exigua (Walker, 1858)
Eublemma flaviceps Hampson, 1902
Eublemma flavicosta Hampson, 1910
Eublemma flavida Hampson, 1902
Eublemma flavinia (Hampson, 1902)
Eublemma foedosa (Guenée, 1852)
Eublemma fulvitermina Hampson, 1910
Eublemma glaucizona Hampson, 1908
Eublemma goniogramma Hampson, 1910
Eublemma griseofimbriata Gaede, 1935
Eublemma hemichiona Hampson, 1918
Eublemma himmighoffeni (Millière, 1867)
Eublemma kettlewelli Wiltshire, 1988
Eublemma lentirosea Hampson, 1910
Eublemma leucanitis Hampson, 1910
Eublemma leucodicranon Grünberg, 1910
Eublemma leucomelana Hampson, 1902
Eublemma leuconeura Hampson, 1910
Eublemma melabasis Hampson, 1914
Eublemma melanodonta Hampson, 1910
Eublemma mesophaea Hampson, 1910
Eublemma minima (Guenée, 1852)
Eublemma nigrivitta Hampson, 1902
Eublemma ochrobasis Hampson, 1910
Eublemma ornatula (Felder & Rogenhofer, 1874)
Eublemma parva (Hübner, [1808])
Eublemma penicillata Hampson, 1902
Eublemma plumbosa Distant, 1899
Eublemma postrosea Gaede, 1935
Eublemma postrufa Hampson, 1914
Eublemma punctilinea Hampson, 1902
Eublemma pyrastis Hampson, 1910
Eublemma ragusana (Freyer, 1844)
Eublemma rivula (Moore, 1882)
Eublemma rubripuncta (Hampson, 1902)
Eublemma rufimixta Hampson, 1918
Eublemma sabia (Felder & Rogenhofer, 1874)
Eublemma scitula (Rambur, 1833)
Eublemma sperans (Felder & Rogenhofer, 1874)
Eublemma staudingeri (Wallengren, 1875)
Eublemma stictilinea Hampson, 1910
Eublemma stygiochroa Hampson, 1910
Eublemma stygiodonta Hampson, 1910
Eublemma therma Hampson, 1910
Eublemma thermochroa Hampson, 1910
Eublemma thermosticta Hampson, 1910
Eublemma titanica Hampson, 1910
Eublemma uninotata Hampson, 1902
Eublemmistis chlorozonea Hampson, 1902
Eublemmoides apicimacula (Mabille, 1880)

Eudocima cajeta (Cramer, 1775)
Eudocima divitiosa (Walker, 1869)
Eudocima fullonia (Clerck, 1764)
Eudocima materna (Linnaeus, 1767)
Eulocastra aethiops (Distant, 1898)
Eulocastra hypotaenia (Wallengren, 1860)
Eumichtis rubrimixta Hampson, 1906
Euonychodes albivenata Warren, 1914
Euplexia augens Felder & Rogenhofer, 1874
Euplexia catephiodes Hampson, 1908
Euplexia nyassana Gaede, 1915
Eustrotia albibasis (Hampson, 1902)
Eustrotia albifascia (Walker, 1865)
Eustrotia albifissa (Hampson, 1902)
Eustrotia angulissima Gaede, 1935
Eustrotia bryophilina Hampson, 1910
Eustrotia catoxantha Hampson, 1910
Eustrotia decissima (Walker, 1865)
Eustrotia genuflexa (Hampson, 1902)
Eustrotia megalena (Mabille, 1900)
Eustrotia olivula (Guenée, 1852)
Eustrotia schencki Strand, 1912

Eutelia adulatrix (Hübner, 1813)
Eutelia amatrix Walker, 1858
Eutelia blandiatrix (Guenée, 1852)
Eutelia bowkeri (Felder & Rogenhofer, 1874)
Eutelia callichroma (Distant, 1901)
Eutelia catephioides (Guenée, 1852)
Eutelia discitriga Walker, 1865
Eutelia favillatrix (Guenée, 1852)
Eutelia fulvigrisea Warren, 1914
Eutelia gilvicolor Mabille, 1900
Eutelia grisescens Hampson, 1916
Eutelia histrio (Saalmüller, 1880)
Eutelia leighi Hampson, 1905
Eutelia leucodelta Hampson, 1905
Eutelia mima Prout, 1925
Eutelia ocellaria Berio, 1966
Eutelia ocularis (Saalmüller, 1891)
Eutelia polychorda Hampson, 1902
Eutelia rivata Hampson, 1902
Eutelia subrubens (Mabille, 1890)
Eutelia symphonica Hampson, 1902
Eutelia violescens (Hampson, 1912)
Euterpiodes pienaari (Distant, 1898)
Euxoa albiorbis Hampson, 1909
Euxoa hendersoni Pinhey, 1968
Euxootera bilacteata (Berio, 1962)

Exophyla molybdea Hampson, 1926
Exophyla multistriata Hampson, 1910
Exophyla platti Prout, 1925
Exophyla poliotis (Hampson, 1902)
Facidia vacillans (Walker, 1858)
Facidina semifimbria (Walker, 1858)
Feliniopsis africana (Schaus & Clements, 1893)
Feliniopsis breviuscula (Walker, 1858)
Feliniopsis connivens (Felder & Rogenhofer, 1874)
Feliniopsis consummata (Walker, 1857)
Feliniopsis gueneei (Laporte, 1973)
Feliniopsis hosplitoides (Laporte, 1979)
Feliniopsis indigna (Herrich-Schäffer, [1854])
Feliniopsis nigribarbata (Hampson, 1908)
Feliniopsis thoracica (Walker, 1858)
Fodina arctioides Walker, 1865
Fodina embolophora Hampson, 1902
Fodina hypercompoides Walker, 1865
Fulvarba fulvescens (Hampson, 1910)
Gesonia stictigramma Hampson, 1926
Gnamptogyia diagonalis Hampson, 1910
Gracilodes caffra Guenée, 1852
Gracilodes nysa Guenée, 1852
Grammarctia bilinea (Walker, 1865)

Grammodes afrocculta Berio, 1956
Grammodes bifasciata (Petagna, 1787)
Grammodes congenita Walker, 1858
Grammodes euclidioides Guenée, 1852
Grammodes exclusiva Pagenstecher, 1907
Grammodes geometrica (Fabricius, 1775)
Grammodes monodonta Berio, 1956
Grammodes stolida (Fabricius, 1775)
Grammoscelis leuconeura Hampson, 1906
Graphania atavistis (Hampson, 1902)
Hadena bulgeri (Felder & Rogenhofer, 1874)
Hadena fusifasciata Walker, 1865
Hadena mamestroides Walker, 1865
Hadena ruptilinea (Walker, 1857)
Hadjina carcaroda (Distant, 1901)
Hadjina obscura Hampson, 1918
Halochroa eudela D. S. Fletcher, 1963
Helicoverpa armigera (Hübner, [1808])
Helicoverpa assulta (Guenée, 1852)
Helicoverpa toddi Hardwick, 1965
Heliocheilus biocularis (Gaede, 1915)
Heliocheilus stigmatia (Hampson, 1903)
Heliophisma catocalina Holland, 1894
Heliophisma klugii (Boisduval, 1833)
Heliothis charmione (Stoll, 1790)
Heliothis conifera (Hampson, 1913)
Heliothis flavescens (Janse, 1917)
Heliothis fuscimacula (Janse, 1917)
Heliothis pauliani Viette, 1959
Heliothis scutuligera Guenée, 1852
Heliothis xanthiata Walker, 1865
Hemiceratoides hieroglyphica (Saalmüller, 1891)
Hemiceratoides sittaca (Karsch, 1896)
Heraclia aemulatrix (Westwood, 1881)
Heraclia africana (Butler, 1875)
Heraclia butleri (Walker, 1869)
Heraclia durbania (Stoneham, 1964)
Heraclia geryon (Fabricius, 1781)
Heraclia superba (Butler, 1875)
Herpeperas barnesi Pinhey, 1968
Herpeperas rudis (Walker, 1865)
Hespagarista echione (Boisduval, 1847)
Heteropalpia vetusta (Walker, 1865)
Hiccoda nigripalpis (Walker, 1866)
Hipoepa fractalis (Guenée, 1854)
Holocryptis erosides (Hampson, 1902)
Hondryches phalaeniformis (Guenée, 1852)
Honeyia clearchus (Fawcett, 1916)
Honeyia tertia Hacker & Fibiger, 2007
Hyamia subterminalis Walker, 1866
Hydrillodes bryophiloides (Butler, 1876)
Hydrillodes lentalis Guenée, 1854
Hydrillodes uliginosalis Guenée, 1854

Hypanua roseitincta Hampson, 1918
Hypanua xylina (Distant, 1898)
Hypena abyssinialis Guenée, 1854
Hypena cherylae Lödl, 1995
Hypena cinctipedalis Zeller, 1852
Hypena fusculalis Saalmüller, 1891
Hypena holophaea Hampson, 1902
Hypena jussalis Walker, 1859
Hypena laceratalis Walker, 1859
Hypena laetalimaior Lödl, 1994
Hypena laetalis Walker, 1859
Hypena lividalis (Hübner, 1790)
Hypena melanistis Hampson, 1902
Hypena neoplyta Prout, 1925
Hypena obacerralis Walker, [1859]
Hypena polycyma Hampson, 1902
Hypena puncticosta Prout, 1925
Hypena senialis Guenée, 1854
Hypena tetrasticta Hampson, 1910
Hypena varialis Walker, 1866
Hypena vulgatalis Walker, 1859
Hypercodia wheeleri Pinhey, 1968
Hypocala bohemani (Wallengren, 1856)
Hypocala deflorata (Fabricius, 1794)
Hypocala genuina (Wallengren, 1856)
Hypocala plumicornis Guenée, 1852
Hypocala rostrata (Fabricius, 1794)
Hypoplexia algoa (Felder & Rogenhofer, 1874)
Hypoplexia conjuncta Hampson, 1908
Hypoplexia externa (Walker, 1857)
Hypoplexia melanica Hampson, 1911
Hypoplexia varicolor (Warren, 1914)
Hypopyra capensis Herrich-Schäffer, 1854
Hypopyra guttata Wallengren, 1856
Hyposada hydrocampata (Guenée, 1858)
Hypotacha nigristria (Hampson, 1902)
Hypotacha retracta (Hampson, 1902)
Hypotype nigridentata (Hampson, 1902)
Hypotype scotomista (Hampson, 1902)
Iambia brunnea Warren, 1914
Iambia inferalis Walker, 1863
Iambia jansei Berio, 1966
Iambia melanochlora (Hampson, 1902)
Iambia transversa (Moore, 1882)
Iambiodes nyctostola Hampson, 1918
Idia auge (Hampson, 1902)
Idia gigantalis (Hampson, 1902)
Idia pulverea (Hampson, 1902)
Interdelta mediafricana Berio, 1964
Isadelphina vinacea (Hampson, 1902)
Janseodes melanospila (Guenée, 1852)
Klugeana philoxalis Geertsema, 1990
Klugeana swartlandensis Geertsema, 1990
Lacera alope (Cramer, 1780)
Leiorhynx argentifascia Hampson, 1902
Leoniloma convergens Hampson, 1926
Leucania acutangula (Gaede, 1816)
Leucania amens Guenée, 1852
Leucania apparata Wallengren, 1875
Leucania atrimacula Hampson, 1902
Leucania baziyae Möschler, 1883
Leucania hamata Wallengren, 1856
Leucania insularis Butler, 1880
Leucania insulicola Guenée, 1852
Leucania interciliata Hampson, 1902
Leucania internata Möschler, 1883
Leucania loreyi (Duponchel, 1827)
Leucania melanostrota (Hampson, 1905)
Leucania melianoides Möschler, 1883
Leucania murcida (Wallengren, 1875)
Leucania nebulosa Hampson, 1902
Leucania nigrisparsa Hampson, 1902
Leucania persecta (Hampson, 1905)
Leucania phaea Hampson, 1902
Leucania phaeochroa (Hampson, 1905)
Leucania polyrabda (Hampson, 1905)
Leucania prominens (Walker, 1856)
Leucania punctulata Wallengren, 1856
Leucania quadricuspidata Wallengren, 1856
Leucania rhabdophora Hampson, 1902
Leucania rubrescens (Hampson, 1905)
Leucania sarca Hampson, 1902
Leucania tacuna Felder & Rogenhofer, 1874
Leucania uncinata Gaede, 1916
Leucania usta Hampson, 1902
Leucania ustata (Hampson, 1907)
Leucania zeae (Duponchel, 1827)
Leucochlaena aenigma Pinhey, 1968
Leucotrachea leucomelanica Janse, 1937
Leucotrachea melanobasis (Hampson, 1902)
Leucotrachea melanodonta (Hampson, 1908)
Leucotrachea melanoleuca (Hampson, 1902)
Leucovis alba (Rothschild, 1897)
Leumicamia leucosoma (Felder & Rogenhofer, 1874)
Lipatephia illegitima (Wallengren, 1875)
Lithacodia binorbis (Hampson, 1902)
Lithacodia blandula (Guenée, 1862)
Lithacodia caffristis Hampson, 1910
Lithacodia normalis Hampson, 1910
Lithacodia varicolora (Hampson, 1902)
Lophocyttarra phoenicoxantha Hampson, 1914

Lophonotidia melanoleuca Janse, 1937
Lophonotidia nocturna Hampson, 1901
Lophoptera litigiosa (Boisduval, 1833)
Lophoruza semiscripta (Mabille, 1893)
Lophotarsia ochroprocta Hampson, 1902
Lophotarsia uniformis Berio, 1966
Lophotavia globulipes (Walker, 1865)
Loxioda ochrota (Hampson, 1909)
Lycophotia ecvinacea Hampson, 1903
Lycophotia melanephra Hampson, 1909
Lycophotia postventa (Geyer, 1837)
Lygephila salax (Guenée, 1852)
Mamestra catephiodes Walker, 1865
Manga melanodonta (Hampson, 1910)
Marathyssa albidisca (Hampson, 1905)
Marathyssa cistellatrix (Wallengren, 1860)
Marathyssa cuneata (Saalmüller, 1891)
Marcipa alternata Gaede, 1939
Marcipa carcassoni Pelletier, 1975
Marcipa heterospila (Hampson, 1910)
Marcipa pyramidalis (Hampson, 1910)
Masalia disticta (Hampson, 1902)
Masalia flavistrigata (Hampson, 1903)
Masalia galatheae (Wallengren, 1856)
Masalia transvaalica (Distant, 1902)
Massaga virescens Butler, 1874
Matopo scutulata Janse, 1917
Matopo typica Distant, 1898
Maxera atripunctata (Hampson, 1910)
Maxera brachypecten Hampson, 1926
Maxera digoniata (Hampson, 1902)
Maxera marchalii (Boisduval, 1833)
Maxera zygia (Wallengren, 1863)
Mazuca elegantissima Janse, 1939
Mazuca roseistriga D. S. Fletcher, 1963
Mazuca strigicincta Walker, 1866
Melanephia metarhabdota Hampson, 1926
Melanephia nigrescens (Wallengren, 1856)
Meliaba pelopsalis Walker, 1859
Melipotis amphix (Cramer, 1777)
Melipotis mimica (Gaede, 1939)
Meneptera diopis (Hampson, 1905)

Mentaxya albifrons (Geyer, 1837)
Mentaxya atritegulata (Hampson, 1902)
Mentaxya cumulata (Walker, 1865)
Mentaxya fletcheri (Berio, 1955)
Mentaxya ignicollis (Walker, 1857)
Mentaxya indigna (Herrich-Schäffer, 1854)
Mentaxya muscosa Geyer, 1837
Mentaxya percurvata (Berio, 1955)
Mentaxya rimosa (Guenée, 1852)
Mepantadrea simia (Saalmüller, 1891)
Mesogenea persinuosa Hampson, 1910
Mesogenea varians Hampson, 1902
Mesosciera picta Hampson, 1926
Metachrostis decora (Walker, 1869)
Metagarista triphaenoides Walker, 1854
Micragrotis intendens (Walker, 1857)
Micragrotis interstriata (Hampson, 1902)
Micragrotis marwitzi Gaede, 1935
Micragrotis puncticostata (Hampson, 1902)
Micragrotis rufescens Hampson, 1903
Micragrotis strigibasis (Hampson, 1902)
Mimasura innotata Hampson, 1910
Mimasura tripunctoides Poole, 1989
Mimasura unipuncta (Hampson, 1902)
Mimleucania perstriata Hampson, 1909
Miniodes discolor Guenée, 1852
Minucia confinis (Wallengren, 1856)
Minucia finitima (Wallengren, 1856)
Minucia maculata (Wallengren, 1856)
Mionides lichenea Hampson, 1902
Mitrophrys ansorgei (Rothschild, 1897)
Mitrophrys latreillii (Herrich-Schäffer, 1853)
Mitrophrys magna (Walker, 1854)
Mocis conveniens (Walker, 1858)
Mocis frugalis (Fabricius, 1775)
Mocis mayeri (Boisduval, 1833)
Mocis mutuaria (Walker, 1858)
Mocis repanda (Fabricius, 1794)
Myalila typica Strand, 1909
Mythimna caelebs (Grünberg, 1910)
Mythimna combinata (Walker, 1857)
Mythimna natalensis (Butler, 1875)
Mythimna poliastis (Hampson, 1902)
Naarda flavisignata Vári, 1962
Naarda leucopis Hampson, 1902
Naarda melanomma Hampson, 1902
Naarda xanthopis Hampson, 1902
Nagia amplificans (Walker, 1858)
Nagia gravipes Walker, 1858
Nagia linteola (Guenée, 1852)
Nagia melipotica Hampson, 1926
Nagia natalensis (Hampson, 1902)
Nagia sacerdotis Hampson, 1926
Nagia subalbida Hampson, 1926
Namangana atripars Hampson, 1909
Namangana thyatirodes Hampson, 1918
Neochrostis diplogramma Hampson, 1902
Neocucullia albisignata Janse, 1939
Neogalea sunia (Guenée, 1852)
Nodaria brachialis (Zeller, 1852)
Nodaria cornicalis (Fabricius, 1794)
Nodaria externalis Guenée, 1854
Nodaria melaleuca Hampson, 1902
Nodaria nodosalis (Herrich-Schäffer, 1851)
Nonagria intestata Walker, 1856
Nyodes acatharta (Hampson, 1913)
Nyodes lutescens (Herrich-Schäffer, 1854)
Nyodes prasinodes (Prout, 1921)
Nyodes punctata (Gaede, 1934)
Ochrocalama xanthia (Hampson, 1905)
Ochropleura leucogaster (Freyer, 1831)
Ochropleura vicaria Walker, 1857
Odontestra conformis Hampson, 1918
Odontestra vittigera (Hampson, 1902)
Odontoretha featheri Hampson, 1916
Oedebasis ovipennis Hampson, 1902
Oediblemma trogoptera Hampson, 1918
Oglasa arcuata (Fabricius, 1787)
Oglasa confluens Hampson, 1926
Oglasa nana (Walker, 1869)
Oglasa renilinea Gaede, 1939
Oglasa tamsi Gaede, 1939
Ogovia pudens (Holland, 1894)
Oligia ambigua (Walker, 1858)
Oligia confusa Janse, 1937
Oligia instructa (Walker, 1865)
Oligia intermedia Berio, 1976
Oligia subambigua (D. S. Fletcher, 1961)
Omphalestra mesoglauca (Hampson, 1902)
Omphalestra mesomelana (Hampson, 1902)
Oncotibialis flava Janse, 1938
Ophiodes (preocc.) wahlbergi Wallengren, 1856
Ophisma exuleata Möschler, 1883
Ophisma lunulifera Walker, 1865
Ophiusa ambigua (Gerstaecker, 1871)
Ophiusa coronata (Fabricius, 1775)
Ophiusa dianaris (Guenée, 1852)
Ophiusa dilecta Walker, 1865
Ophiusa finifascia (Walker, 1858)
Ophiusa mejanesi (Guenée, 1852)
Ophiusa nocturnia Hampson, 1902
Ophiusa salita Distant, 1898
Ophiusa selenaris (Guenée, 1852)

Ophiusa tirhaca (Cramer, 1777)
Ophiusa tumiditermina Hampson, 1910
Ophiusa violascens Hampson, 1902
Ophiusa violisparsa (L. B. Prout, 1919)
Oraesia albescens Gaede, 1940
Oraesia emarginata (Fabricius, 1794)
Oraesia provocans Walker, [1858]
Oraesia wintgensi (Strand, 1909)
Oria flavescens (Hampson, 1902)
Oruza latifera (Walker, 1869)
Ovios capensis (Herrich-Schäffer, 1854)
Ozarba abscissa (Walker, 1858)
Ozarba accincta (Distant, 1898)
Ozarba acclivis (Felder & Rogenhofer, 1874)
Ozarba albimarginata (Hampson, 1896)
Ozarba atrifera Hampson, 1910
Ozarba bicoloria Gaede, 1935
Ozarba binorbis Hampson, 1910
Ozarba bipartita (Hampson, 1902)
Ozarba chionoperas Hampson, 1918
Ozarba consanguis (Hampson, 1902)
Ozarba contempta (Walker, 1858)
Ozarba corniculans (Wallengren, 1860)
Ozarba corniculantis Berio, 1947
Ozarba cryptochrysea (Hampson, 1902)
Ozarba cyanopasta Hampson, 1910
Ozarba densa (Walker, 1865)
Ozarba fasciata (Wallengren, 1860)
Ozarba festiva Berio, 1950
Ozarba flavipennis Hampson, 1910
Ozarba heliastis (Hampson, 1902)

Ozarba hemiochra Hampson, 1910
Ozarba hemipolia Hampson, 1910
Ozarba hypoxantha (Wallengren, 1860)
Ozarba illimitata Warren, 1914
Ozarba inobtrusa (Hampson, 1902)
Ozarba isocampta Hampson, 1910
Ozarba jansei Berio, 1940
Ozarba madanda (Felder & Rogenhofer, 1874)
Ozarba nigroviridis (Hampson, 1902)
Ozarba nyanza (Felder & Rogenhofer, 1874)
Ozarba olimcorniculans Berio, 1940
Ozarba orthozona (Hampson, 1902)
Ozarba perplexa Saalmüller, 1891
Ozarba phaea (Hampson, 1902)
Ozarba punctithorax Berio, 1940
Ozarba regia Warren, 1914
Ozarba semipurpurea (Hampson, 1902)
Ozarba separabilis Berio, 1940
Ozarba subterminalis Hampson, 1910
Ozarba subtusfimbriata Berio, 1940
Ozarba varia (Walker, 1865)
Paida pulchra (Trimen, 1863)
Pandesma anysa Guenée, 1852
Pandesma muricolor Berio, 1966
Pandesma robusta (Walker, 1858)
Pandesma tempica Möschler, 1883
Pantydia andersoni (Felder & Rogenhofer, 1874)
Pantydia scissa (Walker, 1865)
Parachalciope benitensis (Holland, 1894)
Parachalciope euclidicola (Walker, 1858)
Parachalciope mahura (Felder & Rogenhofer, 1874)
Paracroria major Janse, 1938
Parafodina pentagonalis (Butler, 1894)
Paragria sesamiodes Hampson, 1926
Parallelura palumbiodes (Hampson, 1902)
Paratuerta featheri Fawcett, 1915
Paratuerta marshalli Hampson, 1902
Parca africarabia Wiltshire, 1986
Pareuplexia prolifera (Walker, 1856)
Paroruza lateritia (Felder & Rogenhofer, 1875)
Paroruza subductata (Walker, 1861)
Pataeta transversata Berio, 1966
Penicillaria ethiopica (Hampson, 1920)
Pericyma atrifusa (Hampson, 1902)
Pericyma caffraria (Möschler, 1883)
Pericyma deducta (Walker, 1858)
Pericyma mendax (Walker, 1858)
Pericyma polygramma Hampson, 1913
Pericyma scandulata (Felder & Rogenhofer, 1874)
Pericyma umbrina (Guenée, 1852)
Peridroma goughi D. S. Fletcher, 1963
Peridroma saucia (Hübner, [1808])
Perigea bicyclata Gaede, 1915
Perigea grandirena (Hampson, 1902)
Perigea quadrimacula (Mabille, 1900)
Phaegorista agaristoides Boisduval, 1836
Phaegorista xanthosoma Hampson, 1910
Phalerodes cauta (Hampson, 1902)
Phanaspa aegonalis (Walker, 1859)
Phanaspa derasalis (Guenée, 1854)
Phanaspa dilatatalis Walker, 1866
Phanaspa namaqualis (Guenée, 1854)
Phyllophila griseola (Felder & Rogenhofer, 1874)
Phyllophila rufescens Hampson, 1910
Phytometra africana (Snellen, 1872)
Phytometra carnea (Prout, 1922)
Phytometra duplicalis (Walker, 1866)
Phytometra euchroa Hampson, 1918
Phytometra haemaceps (Hampson, 1910)
Phytometra helesusalis (Walker, 1859)
Phytometra heliriusalis (Walker, 1859)
Phytometra hypopsamma (Hampson, 1926)
Phytometra opsiphora (Hampson, 1926)
Phytometra sacraria (Felder & Rogenhofer, 1874)
Phytometra silona (Schaus, 1893)
Phytometra subflavalis (Walker, 1865)
Plecoptera annexa (Distant, 1898)
Plecoptera arctinotata (Walker, 1865)
Plecoptera aspila Hampson, 1910
Plecoptera chalciope Strand, 1918
Plecoptera flaviceps (Hampson, 1902)
Plecoptera infuscata Hampson, 1910
Plecoptera laniata Hampson, 1910
Plecoptera melalepis Hampson, 1910
Plecoptera melanoscia Hampson, 1926
Plecoptera ovaliplaga (Warren, 1914)
Plecoptera poderis (Wallengren, 1863)
Plecoptera punctilineata Hampson, 1910
Plecoptera resistens (Walker, 1858)
Plecoptera rufirena (Hampson, 1902)
Plecoptera sarcistis Hampson, 1910
Plecoptera stuhlmanni (Pagenstecher, 1893)
Plecoptera thermozona Hampson, 1910
Plecoptera trichophora Hampson, 1910
Plecoptera tripalis (Wallengren, 1863)
Plecoptera zonaria (Distant, 1898)

Plecopterodes deprivata Warren, 1914
Plecopterodes exigua Gaede, 1914
Plecopterodes melliflua (Holland, 1897)
Plecopterodes moderata (Wallengren, 1860)
Pleuronodes arida (Hampson, 1902)
Pleuronodes lepticyma (Hampson, 1909)
Pleuronodes trogopera (Hampson, 1910)
Plusia ablusa Felder & Rogenhofer, 1874
Plusia aenescens Prout, 1921
Plusia angulum Guenée, 1852
Plusia aranea Hampson, 1909
Plusia argyrodonta Hampson, 1910
Plusia clarci Hampson, 1910
Plusia distalagma (Hampson, 1913)
Plusia euchroa (Hampson, 1918)
Plusia euchroides Carcasson, 1965
Plusia geminipuncta Hampson, 1902
Plusia guenei Wallengren, 1856
Plusia lavendula Hampson, 1902
Plusia melanocephala Möschler, 1883
Plusia rectilinea Wallengren, 1856
Plusia roseofasciata Carcasson, 1965
Plusia violascens (Hampson, 1913)
Plusiodonta achalcea Hampson, 1926
Plusiodonta commoda Walker, 1865
Plusiodonta natalensis Walker, 1865
Plusiodonta nictites Hampson, 1902
Plusiodonta wahlbergi (Felder & Rogenhofer, 1874)
Plusiopalpa dichora Holland, 1894
Plusiophaes argosticta D. S. Fletcher, 1961
Plusiophaes bipuncta (Hampson, 1902)
Plusiotricha fletcheri Dufay, 1972
Plusiotricha livida Holland, 1894
Polydesma boarmoides Guenée, 1852
Polydesma scriptilis Guenée, 1852
Polydesma sexmaculata Berio, 1971
Polydesma umbricola Boisduval, 1833
Polypogon caffrarium (Möschler, 1883)
Polypogon fractale (Guenée, 1854)
Polytelodes florifera (Walker, 1858)
Prionofrontia erygidia Hampson, 1902
Prionofrontia strigata Hampson, 1926
Pristanepa platti Hampson, 1926
Procanthia distantii (Dewitz, 1881)
Procanthia nivea Rothschild, 1910
Proconis abrostoloides Hampson, 1902
Procrateria basifascia Pinhey, 1968
Procrateria pterota Hampson, 1909
Progonia grisea (Hampson, 1905)
Progonia luctuosa (Hampson, 1902)
Progonia perarcuata (Hampson, 1902)
Proruaca harmonica Distant, 1901
Proruaca recurrens Hampson, 1902
Proschaliphora albida Hampson, 1909
Proschaliphora butti Rothschild, 1910
Pseudagoma pinheyi Kiriakoff, 1975
Pseudomicrodes ecrufa (Hampson, 1905)
Pseudomicrodes fuscipars Hampson, 1910
Pseudomicrodes mediorufa Hampson, 1910
Pseudomicrodes ochrocraspis Hampson, 1910
Radara prunescens (Hampson, 1902)
Radara subcupralis (Walker, [1866])
Radara thermeola Hampson, 1926
Radara vacillans Walker, 1862
Ramesodes divisa (Hampson, 1902)
Raparna tritonias Hampson, 1902
Rhabdophera hansali (Felder & Rogenhofer, 1874)
Rhanidophora agrippa Druce, 1899
Rhanidophora aurantiaca Hampson, 1902
Rhanidophora cinctigutta (Walker, 1862)
Rhanidophora enucleata Mabille, 1900
Rhanidophora flavigutta Hampson, 1926
Rhanidophora ridens Hampson, 1902
Rhesala goleta (Felder & Rogenhofer, 1874)
Rhesala grisea (Hampson, 1916)
Rhesala moestalis (Walker, 1866)
Rhesalides natalensis Hampson, 1926
Rhizotype palliata Warren, 1914
Rhodochlaena botonga (Felder & Rogenhofer, 1874)
Rhynchina coniodes Vári, 1962
Rhynchina equalisella (Walker, 1863)
Rhynchina perangulata Hampson, 1916
Rhynchina poecilopa Vári, 1962
Rhynchina poliopera Hampson, 1902
Rhynchina revolutalis (Zeller, 1852)
Rhynchina tinctalis (Zeller, 1852)
Rhynchodontodes antistropha (Vári, 1962)
Rivula parallela (Hampson, 1902)
Rivula vicarialis Walker, 1866
Rothia rhaeo (Druce, 1894)
Saalmuellerana schoenheiti (Strand, 1912)
Sarmatia interitalis Guenée, 1854
Saroba cyanescens Hampson, 1926
Schausia coryndoni (Rothschild, 1896)
Sciomesa mesoscia (Hampson, 1918)
Sciomesa scotochroa (Hampson, 1914)
Sclereuxoa paradoxalis (Berio, 1974)
Selenistis annulella (Hampson, 1902)
Serrodes flavitincta Hampson, 1926
Serrodes trispila (Mabille, 1890)
Sesamia albicolor Janse, 1939
Sesamia albivena Hampson, 1902
Sesamia botanephaga Tams & Bowden, 1953
Sesamia calamistis Hampson, 1910
Sesamia coniota Hampson, 1902
Sesamia cretica Lederer, 1857
Sesamia epunctifera Hampson, 1902
Sesamia incerta (Walker, 1856)
Sesamia inferens (Walker, 1856)
Sesamia jansei Tams & Bowden, 1953
Sesamia nonagrioides (Lefèbvre, 1827)
Sesamia poephaga Tams & Bowden, 1953
Sesamia rufescens Hampson, 1910
Sesamia steniptera Hampson, 1914
Sesamia sylvata Janse, 1939
Sesamia taenioleuca (Wallengren, 1866)
Sidemia spodopterodes Hampson, 1908
Simplicia extinctalis (Zeller, 1852)
Simplicia inflexalis Guenée, 1854
Simplicia telamusalis (Walker, 1859)
Sommeria culta Hübner, 1831
Sommeria sinuosa (Hampson, 1905)
Sommeria spilosoma (Felder, 1874)
Sommeria spilosomoides (Walker, 1865)
Sommeria strabonis (Hampson, 1910)
Speia vuteria (Stoll, 1790)

Sphingomorpha chlorea (Cramer, 1777)
Sphingomorpha marshalli Hampson, 1902
Spirama inconspicua (Herrich-Schäffer, 1854)
Spirama miniata (Wallengren, 1856)
Spodoptera apertura (Walker, 1865)
Spodoptera cilium Guenée, 1852
Spodoptera exempta (Walker, 1857)
Spodoptera exigua (Hübner, 1808)
Spodoptera littoralis (Boisduval, 1833)
Spodoptera mauritia (Boisduval, 1833)
Stenopterygia subcurva (Walker, 1857)
Stenosticta grisea Hampson, 1912
Stictoptera antemarginata Saalmüller, 1880
Stictoptera confluens (Walker, 1858)
Stictoptera gabri (Berio, 1970)
Stigmoplusia chalcoides (Dufay, 1968)
Stigmoplusia paraplesia Dufay, 1972
Stomafrontia albifasciata Hampson, 1905
Syfanoidea schencki Bartel, 1903
Syncalama mimica Hampson, 1910
Syncalama turneri Tams, 1930
Syngrapha circumflexa (Linnaeus, 1767)
Tachosa acronyctoides Walker, 1869
Tachosa fumata (Wallengren, 1860)
Tathorhynchus exsiccata (Lederer, 1855)
Tathorhynchus homogyna Hampson, 1902
Tathorhynchus leucobasis Bethune-Baker, 1911
Tathorhynchus plumbea (Distant, 1898)
Tatorinia fumipennis (Felder & Rogenhofer, 1874)
Tavia instruens Walker, 1858
Tavia latebra Hampson, 1926
Tavia nycterina (Boisduval, 1833)
Taviodes subjecta (Walker, 1865)
Tegiapa larentiodes (Prout, 1922)
Tetracme truncataria (Walker, 1861)
Thalpochares caffrorum Wallengren, 1860
Thalpochares squamilinea Felder & Rogenhofer, 1874
Thiacidas cookei (Pinhey, 1958)
Thiacidas duplicata (Grünberg, 1910)
Thiacidas fractilinea (Pinhey, 1968)
Thiacidas intermedia Hacker & Zilli, 2007
Thiacidas nigrimacula (Pinhey, 1968)
Thiacidas permutata Hacker & Zilli, 2007
Thiacidas roseotincta (Pinhey, 1962)
Thyas arcifera (Hampson, 1913)
Thyas rubricata (Holland, 1894)
Thyatirina achatina (Weymer, 1896)

Thysanoplusia chalcedona (Hampson, 1902)
Thysanoplusia exquisita (Felder & Rogenhofer, 1874)
Thysanoplusia indicator (Walker, [1858])
Thysanoplusia sestertia (Felder & Rogenhofer, 1874)
Thysanoplusia tetrastigma (Hampson, 1910)
Timora albisticta Janse, 1917
Timora diarhoda Hampson, 1909
Toana atridiscata Pinhey, 1968
Tolna complicata (Butler, 1880)
Tolna demaculata Strand, 1913
Tolna limula (Möschler, 1883)
Tolna macrosema Hampson, 1913
Tolna sinifera Hampson, 1913
Tolna sypnoides (Butler, 1878)
Tolna variegata (Hampson, 1905)
Tolpia suffuscalis (Swinhoe, 1887)
Trachea normalis Hampson, 1914
Trachea oxylus (Fawcett, 1917)
Tracheplexia albimacula Janse, 1937
Tracheplexia amaranta (Felder & Rogenhofer, 1974)
Tracheplexia lucia (Felder & Rogenhofer, 1974)
Trichoplusia acosmia Dufay, 1972
Trichoplusia arachnoides (Distant, 1901)
Trichoplusia asapheia Dufay, 1977
Trichoplusia callista Dufay, 1972
Trichoplusia capnista Dufay, 1972
Trichoplusia epicharis Dufay, 1972
Trichoplusia glyceia Dufay, 1972
Trichoplusia laportei Dufay, 1972
Trichoplusia molybdina (Dufay, 1968)
Trichoplusia ni (Hübner, [1803])
Trichoplusia orichalcea (Fabricius, 1775)
Trigonodes hyppasia (Cramer, 1779)
Trogocraspis durbanica Hampson, 1918
Tycomarptes inferior (Guenée, 1852)
Tycomarptes praetermissa (Walker, 1857)
Tytroca balnearia (Distant, 1898)
Tytroca leucoptera (Hampson, 1896)
Tytroca metaxantha (Hampson, 1902)
Ugia amaponda (Felder & Rogenhofer, 1874)
Ugia taeniata (Holland, 1894)
Ulochlaena ferruginea (Gaede, 1915)
Ulochlaena fumea (Hampson, 1902)
Ulochlaena reducta (Gaede, 1915)
Ulochlaena sagittata (Gaede, 1915)
Ulochlaena schaeferi Gaede, 1915
Ulotrichopus catocala (Felder & Rogenhofer, 1874)
Ulotrichopus glaucescens Hampson, 1913
Ulotrichopus leucopasta Hampson, 1913
Ulotrichopus lucidus Pinhey, 1968
Ulotrichopus mesoleuca (Walker, 1858)
Ulotrichopus nigricans Laporte, 1973
Ulotrichopus primulina (Hampson, 1902)
Ulotrichopus tessmanni Gaede, 1936
Ulotrichopus variegata (Hampson, 1902)
Vietteania torrentium (Guenée, 1852)
Vittaplusia vittata (Wallengren, 1856)
Xanthia basalis Walker, 1862
Xanthomera leucoglene (Mabille, 1880)
Zalaca anticalis Walker, 1866
Zalaca snelleni (Wallengren, 1875)

References 

Noctuidae